Trumaine Jefferson (born April 21, 1995) is an American long jumper. Jefferson graduated from Oak Ridge High School (Montgomery County, Texas) in 2014, where he competed in various outdoor track and field events. During his college career at the University of Houston, Jefferson achieved his Long Jump personal best of 8.18m at the 2019 NCAA Division I Outdoor Track and Field Championships. In 2019, he also competed in the men's long jump at the 2019 World Athletics Championships held in Doha, Qatar. He did not qualify to compete in the final. Jefferson went on to compete in the men's long jump event at the 2019 Padova International Meeting held in Padova, Italy where he came off on top as 1st. 

Jefferson started off 2021 with a season's best of 8.00m at the Miramar Invitational held at the Ansin Sports Complex in Miramar, Florida. Trumaine Jefferson is qualified and will be competing for a spot on the U.S. Olympic team at the United States Olympic Trials (track and field) in June 2021.

References

External links 
 

Living people
1995 births
Place of birth missing (living people)
American male long jumpers
World Athletics Championships athletes for the United States
Pan American Games track and field athletes for the United States
Athletes (track and field) at the 2019 Pan American Games
Houston Cougars men's track and field athletes